Frederick William (19 July 1692 – 21 January 1711) was Duke of Courland and Semigallia from 1698 to 1711. Frederick Wilhelm was the son of Friedrich Kasimir Kettler, Duke of Courland and Semigallia and Princess Elisabeth Sophie of Brandenburg. During his reign the duchy was occupied by Swedish and later by Russian troops.

Biography 
Friedrich Wilhelm Kettler was born in 1692 in Mitau (now ) in the family of Friedrich Casimir and his second wife Elizabeth Sophia. At the age of seven, after his father's death, on 22 January 1698 he was appointed as the Duke of Courland and Semigallia, however, until the age of majority state was governed by his mother and uncle Ferdinand Kettler, who resided in Danzig.

When in the 1701 Semigallia was occupied by the Swedes, Friedrich Wilhelm and his mother went to his uncle Frederick, who later was crowned the first king in Prussia. He stayed in Prussia until 1709 when, after Russian victories against Sweden, at the age of 17 he was engaged to Anna, daughter of Tsar Ivan V who himself was half brother of Peter the Great. The Council of the Duchy in 1709 recognized Friedrich Wilhelm as an adult and the young Duke arrived in the Libau (now ) in 1710.

He married Anna of Russia on 11 November 1710 (31 October, after the old style) in a grand wedding held in the new Russian capital St. Petersburg, which presented the power of the emerging Russian Empire and its court brilliance. However, on the way back from St. Petersburg, Friedrich Wilhelm died on 21 January 1711 in the postal station, and his widow Anna, together with the Duke's corpse, arrived in Mitau only on 4 March.

After his death, Anna took on the regency of the Duchy.  In 1730 she became Empress of Russia and the Duchy passed to Friedrich Wilhelm's uncle Ferdinand Kettler, but was de facto controlled by Russia. It was restored to independence in 1737, when it passed to the lover of Tsarina Anna, Ernst Johann von Biron.

At the same time in the duchy began the epidemic of Great plague, which killed a large part of the population.

Ancestry

Dukes of Courland
1692 births
1711 deaths
18th-century Latvian people
People from Jelgava